Machava is a given name and surname of Malagasy origin. Notable people with the name include:

Given name 
Rakoto Frah (1923–2001), Malagasy musician
William René Rakoto Mahefarinoro, Malagasy politician

Surname 
José Rakoto (born 1980), Malagasy rugby union player
Prince Rakoto (1829–1863), Malagasy monarch

Given names of Malagasy origin
Surnames of Malagasy origin
Malagasy-language surnames